Alcock is a surname. Notable people with the surname include:

Notable people with the surname Alcock 
 Alfred William Alcock, British naturalist
 C. W. Alcock, British sports administrator and creator of the FA Cup
 Charles R. Alcock, American astronomer
 Deborah Alcock, British author of fiction
 Edward Alcock, English footballer who played for Tranmere Rovers
 George Alcock, British astronomer
 George Alcock (footballer), English footballer
 Glenn Alcock (musician), British drummer
 Harry Alcock, English footballer who played for Walsall
 James Alcock, Psychologist and noted skeptic
 John Alcock, one of several people including
 John Alcock (aviator), pioneer aviator, of Alcock and Brown
 John Alcock (bishop), English bishop of the fifteenth century
 John Alcock (behavioral ecologist), American behavioral ecologist and author
 John Alcock (organist), English organist and composer
 Lara Alcock, British mathematics educator
 Leslie Alcock, British archaeologist
 Mary Alcock (née Cumberland, c. 1742 – 1798), British writer
Sir Michael Alcock, British air chief marshal
 Milly Alcock (born 2000), Australian actress
 Nathan Alcock, British physician
 Rachel Alcock (1862–1939), English physiologist
 Reg Alcock, Canadian politician
 Ronald Alcock (d. 1991), British stamp dealer and philatelic publisher
 Rutherford Alcock, British diplomat
 Siccature Alcock, birth name of Jah Cure, Jamaican reggae musician
 Terry Alcock, English footballer
 Thomas Alcock (adventurer), (died 1563), English traveller and adventurer 
 Thomas Alcock (priest), (1709–1798), clergyman in the Church of England, a pluralist and an author.
 Thomas Alcock (surgeon) (1784–1833) English surgeon
 Thomas Alcock (MP) (1801–1866) British politician
 Vivien Alcock, British children's writer
 Walter Galpin Alcock, English organist and composer
 William Congreve Alcock (c 1771–1813), Irish parliamentarian from Waterford.

See also
 Alcott
 Aycock
 Alcock's canal
 Alcock Island, Antarctica